Veľký Kýr is a village and municipality in the Nové Zámky District in the Nitra Region of south-west Slovakia.

History
In historical records the village was first mentioned in 1113.

Geography
The municipality lies at an altitude of 130 metres and covers an area of 23.638 km². It has a population of about 3095 people.

Ethnicity
The population is about 65% Hungarian and 35% Slovak.

Facilities
The village has a small public library a gym and football pitch. It also has a DVD rental store.

External links
 https://web.archive.org/web/20070513023228/http://www.statistics.sk/mosmis/eng/run.html
 Veľký Kýr – Nové Zámky Okolie

Villages and municipalities in Nové Zámky District
Hungarian communities in Slovakia